The 2010 Burgenland state election was held on 30 May 2010 to elect the members of the 20th Landtag of Burgenland.

The governing Social Democratic Party of Austria (SPÖ) narrowly lost its majority, while the Freedom Party of Austria (FPÖ) and List Burgenland (LBL) made gains. Governor Hans Niessl was returned for a third term.

Background
Prior to amendments made in 2014, the Burgenland constitution mandated that cabinet positions in the state government (state councillors) be allocated between parties proportionally in accordance with the share of votes won by each; this is known as Proporz. As such, the government was a perpetual coalition of all parties that qualified for at least one state councillor.

In the 2005 election, the SPÖ won an absolute majority with 52.2% of votes.

Electoral system
The 36 seats of the Landtag of Burgenland are elected via open list proportional representation in a two-step process. The seats are distributed between seven multi-member constituencies, corresponding to the seven districts of Burgenland (the statutory cities of Eisenstadt and Rust are combined with Eisenstadt-Umgebung District). Apportionment of the seats is based on the results of the most recent census.

For parties to receive any representation in the Landtag, they must either win at least one seat in a constituency directly, or clear a 4 percent state-wide electoral threshold. Seats are distributed in constituencies according to the Hare quota, with any remaining seats allocated using the D'Hondt method at the state level, to ensure overall proportionality between a party's vote share and its share of seats.

In addition to voting for a political party, voters may cast preferential votes for specific candidates of that party, but are not required to do so. These additional votes do not affect the proportional allocation based on the vote for the party or list, but can change the rank order of candidates on a party's lists at the state and constituency level. Voters may cast one preferential vote at the state level, or three at the constituency level. A voter may not cross party-lines to cast a preference vote for a candidate of another party; such preference votes are invalid.

Contesting parties

In addition to the parties already represented in the Landtag, one party collected enough signatures to be placed on the ballot.

 List Burgenland (LBL)

Results

Results by constituency

References

2010 elections in Austria
State elections in Austria
May 2010 events in Europe